On 25 June 2017, a tanker truck exploded near Ahmedpur East in Pakistan's Bahawalpur District, killing 219 people and injuring at least 34 others. The truck overturned when its driver attempted to make a sharp turn on the N-5 National Highway. Once the news of the accident spread to nearby villages, hundreds of residents rushed to the scene to loot the truck of its cargo. The truck then exploded; early reports suggested the explosion was caused by someone lighting a cigarette.

Accident
Around 06:00 local time (01:00 GMT), a tank truck carrying 50,000 litres  of fuel overturned due to the driver sleeping on N-5 National Highway near Ahmedpur East, Bahawalpur District, in Punjab, Pakistan. The truck was travelling from Karachi to Vehari.

News of the accident quickly spread to the nearby village of Ramzanpur Joya, with villagers being alerted via the loudspeaker on top of a local mosque. A large number of people busy working in mango farms beside the road (one source estimated about 500), including men, women, and children, subsequently gathered at the site to collect leaking petrol. The crowd ignored attempts by police to clear the area. About 10 minutes later, the truck exploded after leaked fuel from its damaged container caught fire, killing at least 148 people. Dozens of those injured died in the following days, bringing the death toll to 219 with 34 others still being treated in hospitals as of 11 July 2017. According to some media reports, the explosion occurred about 45 minutes after the initial truck crash.

There were conflicting preliminary reports about the cause of the explosion: some said the fuel was ignited by an attempt to light a cigarette near the overturned tanker, and others blamed a spark from one of the numerous cars and motorcycles that rushed to the scene.

Response
National Highways & Motorway Police suspended traffic and set up two diversions, near Noorpur Nauranga and further ahead of Dera Nawaz. The Rescue 1122 and fire brigade arrived on the site of the incident immediately after the blaze started, and rescue operations were initiated. Firefighters fought the blaze for over two hours before extinguishing the fire.

At least 90 of the victims were taken to District Headquarters Hospital and Bahawal Victoria Hospital in Bahawalpur. Pakistan Army helicopters were used to transfer 51 injured people from Bahawalpur to Nishtar Hospital in Multan.

Aftermath
Most bodies were burned beyond recognition, many down to their skeletons. At least six cars and twelve motorcycles were burned in the explosion. The highway was littered with kitchen utensils, pots, water coolers, jerrycans and buckets which victims had brought to collect the petrol. The driver of the fuel tanker was kept under arrest for investigation, but he was one of those in critical condition and later died at a hospital. Over 120 dead victims, who were beyond recognition, were buried in a mass grave.

Reactions
Prime Minister Nawaz Sharif expressed his grief and directed Punjab to provide "full medical assistance". He cut short a private trip to London and returned to Pakistan in the aftermath of the explosion.

The British High Commission in Pakistan, the Embassy of the United States in Islamabad and UNSG António Guterres sent condolences.

References

2017 crimes in Pakistan
2017 disasters in Pakistan
2017 in Punjab, Pakistan
2017 road incidents in Asia
2010s crimes in Punjab, Pakistan
2017 explosion
Deaths caused by petroleum looting 
Disasters in Punjab, Pakistan
Explosions in 2017
Explosions in Punjab, Pakistan
June 2017 crimes in Asia
June 2017 events in Pakistan
Road incidents in Pakistan
Tanker explosions